Thomas Guthrie Marshall (born 5 July 1990) is a New Zealand rugby union player who plays fullback, centre and wing. Marshall was educated at Nelson College from 2004 to 2008.

Career
At the end of the 2015 season he headed overseas to play for English side Gloucester. He played 63 games for the side before it was announced in June 2020 that Marshall had left Gloucester to join Japanese side the Red Hurricanes. A side under the leadership of former Gloucester head coach Johan Ackermann.

References

External links
Tom Marshall itsrugby.co.uk Player Statistics

Living people
1990 births
Rugby union players from Auckland
New Zealand rugby union players
Crusaders (rugby union) players
Chiefs (rugby union) players
Rugby union fullbacks
Rugby union wings
Rugby union centres
Tasman rugby union players
People educated at Nelson College
Gloucester Rugby players
NTT DoCoMo Red Hurricanes Osaka players
Green Rockets Tokatsu players